Biskupie refers to the following places in Poland:

 Biskupie, Greater Poland Voivodeship
 Biskupie, Lublin Voivodeship
 Biskupie-Kolonia, Gmina Wólka
 Biskupie-Kolonia, Gmina Wysokie